Thomas Baynham (1536-1611) was Lord of the Manor of Clearwell, in the Forest of Dean, Gloucestershire. He served as Sheriff of Gloucestershire in 1582 and 1602. He died on 2 October 1611, aged 75, and was buried at Newland, Gloucestershire.

Origins
He was the 3rd son of Sir George Baynham (died 1546), Sheriff of Gloucestershire in 1543, by Cecilia Gage, daughter of Sir John Gage. He succeeded his elder brother Christopher Baynham (born 1529) in the Baynham estates.

Marriage and progeny
He married Mary Winter, daughter of William Winter of Lydney, Gloucestershire. They had two sons who both died without issue and two daughters, joint-co-heiresses:
Cecily, married Sir William Throckmorton, 1st Baronet(c. 1579-1628), of Tortworth, Gloucestershire.
Joanna (born 1585), married John Vaughan of Kinnersley, Herefordshire (died pre-1620)

Sources
MacLean, Sir John,  The History of the Manors of Dean Magna and Abenhall. Published in: Transactions of the Bristol and Gloucestershire Archaeological Society, Vol.6, 1881-2,pp. 185-187, pedigree of Baynham

High Sheriffs of Gloucestershire
People from Forest of Dean District
1536 births
1611 deaths